Hardingrove is an unincorporated community in Tobin Township, Perry County, in the U.S. state of Indiana.

History
Hardingrove was settled by members of the Hardin family, and an old variant rendering of the name is "Hardin Grove". A post office was established at Hardingrove in 1893, and remained in operation until it was discontinued in 1937. Louise Hardin served as an early postmaster.

Geography

References

Unincorporated communities in Perry County, Indiana
Unincorporated communities in Indiana